Outlaws of Cherokee Trail is a 1941 American Western "Three Mesquiteers" B-movie directed by Lester Orlebeck.

Cast 
 Tom Tyler as Stony Brooke
 Bob Steele as Tucson Smith
 Rufe Davis as Lullaby Joslin
 Lois Collier as Doris Sheldon
 Tom Chatterton as Capt. Sheldon
 Joel Friedkin as Judge
 Roy Barcroft as Val Lamar
 Phillip Trent as Fake Jim Warren (as Philip Trent)
 Rex Lease as Fake Marshal
 Peggy Lynn as Belle

References

External links 

1941 films
1941 Western (genre) films
American Western (genre) films
American black-and-white films
Republic Pictures films
Three Mesquiteers films
Films directed by Lester Orlebeck
1940s English-language films
1940s American films